Edward Douglass White (March 3, 1795 – April 18, 1847) was tenth Governor of Louisiana and a member of the United States House of Representatives. He served five non-consecutive terms in Congress, as an adherent of Henry Clay of Kentucky and the Whig Party.

Biography 
White was born in Maury County, Tennessee, the illegitimate son of James White. (Although his parents apparently never married, his father acknowledged him, and the circumstances of his birth did not impede his education or future success.) James White was a delegate to the Continental Congress. While a young boy, Edward moved with his father to Louisiana.

In 1815, White graduated from the former University of Nashville, afterward beginning a law practice in Donaldsonville, Louisiana, the seat of Ascension Parish, south of Baton Rouge. Ten years later, he was appointed by Governor Henry S. Johnson, also of Donaldsonville, as an Associate Judge of the New Orleans Municipal Court in 1825.

In 1834 he married Catherine Sidney Lee Ringgold, daughter of Tench Ringgold, long the US Marshal in the District of Columbia. Their children included Edward Douglass White Jr.

Political career 
Elected to the 21st United States Congress in 1828, White served three terms from 1829 until his resignation in 1834 after being elected as governor. He served a single term as governor (1835–1839). Afterward, he was elected to the US Congress again, serving two more terms from 1839 until 1843.

Lioness incident 
White was among the survivors of the steamboat Lioness explosion that occurred on the Red River south of Natchitoches on May 19, 1833.

Death and burial 
He died in New Orleans and was buried at St. Joseph's Catholic Cemetery in Thibodaux, Louisiana. 

His home in Thibodaux is now operated by the Louisiana State Museum as the Edward Douglass White Historic Site.

Family 
White's son Edward Douglass White Jr. was elected by the state legislature as a United States senator from Louisiana. He was appointed as an associate justice of the United States Supreme Court, later appointed 9th Chief Justice by U.S. President William Howard Taft.

References

Sources

 Political Graveyard

External links
State of Louisiana - Biography
Cemetery Memorial by La-Cemeteries

1795 births
1847 deaths
Governors of Louisiana
People from Donaldsonville, Louisiana
People from Thibodaux, Louisiana
People from Maury County, Tennessee
Louisiana National Republicans
National Republican Party members of the United States House of Representatives
Whig Party members of the United States House of Representatives from Louisiana
19th-century American politicians
Whig Party state governors of the United States
Shipwreck survivors